Alone Together is an album by American jazz saxophonist Benny Carter and his orchestra with the Oscar Peterson Quartet. The album was recorded in 1952 and released by Norgran Records. It includes tracks that were released on the 10 inch LP The Formidable Benny Carter and recordings from the same sessions.

Reception

Allmusic gave the album two stars.

Track listing

Note: tracks 1-3, 7-10, 12 are included on the original The Formidable Benny Carter 10" album.

Personnel 
 Benny Carter – alto saxophone
 Oscar Peterson – piano
 Barney Kessel – guitar
 Ray Brown – double bass
 Buddy Rich – drums
 Arranged and conducted by Joe Glover

References 

1956 albums
Benny Carter albums
Norgran Records albums
Verve Records albums
Albums produced by Norman Granz